The 2002 Scottish Cup Final was played on 4 May 2002 at Hampden Park in Glasgow and was the final of the 117th Scottish Cup. Celtic and Rangers contested the match, Rangers won the match 3–2, thanks to Peter Løvenkrands's last-minute goal.

Match details

References

2002
Cup Final
Scottish Cup Final 2002
Scottish Cup Final 2002
2000s in Glasgow
May 2002 sports events in the United Kingdom
Old Firm matches